Dare to Dream may refer to:

Dare to Dream (Yanni album)
Dare to Dream (Billy Gilman album)
Dare to Dream (Irish Stew of Sindidun album)
Dare to Dream (Troye Sivan EP), 2007
"Dare to Dream" (song), a single from Jo Dee Messina's 2000 album Burn
Dare to Dream: A Study in the Imagination of a Ten-Year-Old Boy, a video game developed by Cliff Bleszinski and published by Epic Games
Dare to Dream: The Story of the U.S. Women's Soccer Team
 Dare To Dream, the slogan for Eurovision Song Contest 2019